The Winnisimmet Street Railway was a former streetcar railroad in Chelsea, Massachusetts. The railway was incorporated on May 26, 1857, as a horsecar railway, running between Chelsea's Prattville neighborhood and the Winnisimmet Ferry to Boston's North End. The line was later leased to the Lynn and Boston Railroad.

References

Chelsea, Massachusetts
Defunct Massachusetts railroads
Railway companies established in 1857
Streetcars in the Boston area
1857 establishments in Massachusetts